Mark Canton (born June 19, 1949) is an American film producer and executive.

Life and early career
Canton was born to a Jewish family in Queens, New York City, the son of Shirley and Arthur Canton, who worked in the film industry on marketing and publicity - including such films as Lawrence of Arabia. As a young adult, he met well known movie personalities like Alfred Hitchcock, David Lean, and Doris Day when they visited the family's apartment. After working in the mail room of Warner Bros. while studying at the University of California, Los Angeles, Canton started working for 20th Century Fox and later had jobs with film director Franklin Schaffner, with producer Jon Peters, and in the 1970s as executive assistant to Mike Medavoy at United Artists, before working as executive vice president at Warner Bros. from 1980 onwards. Successes he was involved in at the time include 1983's National Lampoon's Vacation, Purple Rain, and the Batman and Lethal Weapon film series, but also notorious box office failures like The Bonfire of the Vanities (1990), a picture he described as "the best movie I ever saw" at its first screening.

Career
In 1991, Canton quit Warner Bros. where he was executive vice president of the Worldwide Motion Picture Production unit. Warner Bros. let him out of his contract fifteen months early with studio head Bob Daly saying "from our standpoint this was a job that was going to be eliminated." He then became chairman of Sony's Columbia Pictures (later Columbia-TriStar Pictures), where he was involved with some failures like Geronimo: An American Legend, but also with blockbusters such as Men in Black, Air Force One, and My Best Friend's Wedding.

Canton was fired by Sony in 1996, after a series of relative flops including Last Action Hero (a film Canton described as "probably the best action movie of all time") and The Cable Guy, before his final string of movies could become blockbusters. Described at the time as both "known for enthusiasm, rapid-fire talk, a sleek Italian wardrobe and a youthful style" and "a braggart who was lucky to have become chairman of a studio in the first place", Canton was in those years "one of the most powerful executives in Hollywood".

In 1998, Canton became an independent film producer, with Jack Frost starring Michael Keaton as his first major production. Backed by the German company Senator Entertainment from August 2000 onwards, he struck a first-look deal with Warner Bros. By the end of 2001, the shares of Senator had dropped substantially and Canton had to close down his production company.

In 2002, he was the chief executive of Artists Production Group, the movie branch of Artist Management Group. After leaving APG in November 2003, he created Atmosphere Entertainment together with Mark Kimsey, an investment manager. The aims were to produce films and television programming. With this company, he produced blockbusters such as 300, Immortals, and The Spiderwick Chronicles. In his roles as executive, chairman, and producer, Canton has been involved in over 300 major Hollywood productions.

Personal life
Canton was married to Oscar-winning producer Wendy Finerman, with whom he has three children. His brother is the film producer Neil Canton. They co-produced the 2000 film Get Carter.

Filmography
He was a producer in all films unless otherwise noted.

Film

Production manager

Miscellaneous crew

Thanks

Television

References

External links
 

1949 births
Film producers from New York (state)
American film studio executives
Warner Bros. people
20th-century American Jews
Living people
People from Queens, New York
University of California, Los Angeles alumni
21st-century American Jews
Presidents of Columbia Pictures